Harvey Howard is an English former professional rugby league footballer who played in the 1990s and 2000s. A Great Britain and England international representative , he played club football in England for Widnes, Leeds, Bradford Bulls and Wigan, and in Australia for the Eastern Suburbs Roosters, Western Suburbs Magpies and the Brisbane Broncos, with whom he won the 2000 grand final.

Playing career
Howard played in Australia, while going over to England regularly. Howard played left- in Widnes 24-0 victory over Leeds in the 1991–92 Regal Trophy Final during the 1991–92 season at Central Park, Wigan on Saturday 11 January 1992. He played right- in Widnes' 14-20 defeat by Wigan in the 1993 Challenge Cup Final during the 1992–93 season at Wembley Stadium, London on Saturday 1 May 1993, played right- in Leeds' 16-26 defeat by Wigan in the 1994 Challenge Cup Final during the 1993–94 season at Wembley Stadium, London on Saturday 30 April 1994, and played left- in the 10-30 defeat by Wigan in the 1995 Challenge Cup Final during the 1994–95 season at Wembley Stadium, London on Saturday 29 April 1995. Also while at Leeds, in 1995 he won his first international cap for England against Wales.

During his time with the Western Suburbs Magpies on the playing roster, he gained several nicknames, including Harves and Harvester, freight, but also mainly as Night Train. This was because of a song at the time which he insisted the whole team listen to a song called "Night Train". In 1997, he played for the 'Rest of the World' against Australia. While at Bradford Bulls in 1998 Howard won a cap for Great Britain against New Zealand as a substitute.

After four seasons with Wests in the late 1990s, Howard could not win a place in the joint team, Wests Tigers. Wayne Bennett had no such concern, using Howard as a stop-gap  and bringing him off the bench in the Broncos' 2000 NRL Grand Final win over the Sydney Roosters. After that Howard represented England in the 2000 Rugby League World Cup, also mostly from the interchange bench.

He played  for the Wigan Warriors in the 2001 Super League Grand Final defeat by the Bradford Bulls.

Post playing
Harvey returned to Australia on a permanent basis, and now works full-time for the Western Suburbs Magpies DRLFC as Development officer, in charge of the junior grades of football, as well as the Junior Magpies development teams.

Howard was appointed Hull Kingston Rovers' first team coach in late 2004. Howard was dismissed shortly before the Northern Rail Cup Final, which the Hull Kingston Roverswent on to win 18-16 over Castleford Tigers, with the Hull Kingston Rovers utilising the temporary player-coaching abilities of James Webster. Permanently taking over from Howard was the former Toulouse coach, Justin Morgan.

References

External links

Statistics at rugbyleagueproject.org
Profile at Leeds Rhinos official website

1968 births
Living people
Bradford Bulls players
Brisbane Broncos players
England national rugby league team players
English rugby league coaches
English rugby league players
Great Britain national rugby league team players
Hull Kingston Rovers coaches
Leeds Rhinos players
Rochdale Hornets players
Rugby league props
Sydney Roosters players
Western Suburbs Magpies players
Widnes Vikings players
Wigan Warriors players